Americium bromide may refer to:

 Americium(II) bromide
 Americium(III) bromide